Human Access Project is an organization based in Portland, Oregon, whose mission is "Transforming Portland's Relationship with the Willamette River". The organization's vision is a city in love with its river.  The organization was founded by Willie Levenson, whose official title is the organization's Ringleader.

History and activities
The group spearheaded the creation of the River Hugger Swim Team, Audrey McCall Beach and Poet's Beach, the opening of the Kevin Duckworth Dock for swimming, fishing and non-motorized boating, and organizes events such as The Big Float, Mayoral Swim and Valentine's Dip.

Human Access Project was formed in 2010 by founder Willie Levenson. On July 5, 2013, Human Access Project set a Guinness World Record for “Longest line of swim rings / tubes” with a total of 620 participants.

See also

 Kevin Duckworth Memorial Dock

References

External links
 

2010 establishments in Oregon
Organizations based in Portland, Oregon
Organizations established in 2010
Willamette River